Saint Mari, also known as Mares and originally named Palut, is a saint of the Church of the East. He was converted by Thaddeus of Edessa, or Addai, and is said to have had Mar Aggai as his spiritual director.

Missionary work
He is believed to have done missionary work around Nineveh, Nisibis, and along the Euphrates, and is said to have been one of the great apostles to Syria and Persia. He was buried in Dair-Kuni.

Liturgy
His feast day is 5 August in the Christian calendar. He and Thaddeus are credited with the Liturgy of Addai and Mari.

Sainthoood
Mari is venerated as a saint by the Assyrian Church of the East, the Chaldean Catholic Church, and the Syro-Malabar Catholic Church. He is  identified as St. Mari of the seventy disciples with whom the Apocryphal Acts of Mar Mari are connected.

References

Bibliography
 Attwater, Donald and Catherine Rachel John. The Penguin Dictionary of Saints. 3rd edition. New York: Penguin Books, 1993.
 Aux origines de l'eglise de Perse: les Actes de Mar Mari. Еd. par Jullien C., Jullien F. Leuven, Peeters, 2003, VIII-137 p. (Corpus Scriptorum Christianorum Orientalium, 604).
 Jullien C., Jullien F. Les Actes de Mar Mari. Leuven, Peeters, 2003, VIII, 50 p. (Corpus Scriptorum Christianorum Orientalium, 602).
 The Acts of Mar Mari the Apostle. Ed. by Amir Harrak. Atlanta (GA), Society of Biblical Literature, 2005, 134 pp. (Writings from the Greco-Roman World, 11).
 Atti di Mar Mari. Ed. Ilaria Ramelli. Brescia: Paideia, 2008. 234 p. (Testi del Vicino Oriente antico 7, Letteratura della Siria cristiana, 2).

External links
Catholic Encyclopedia: Liturgy of Addeus and Maris

Converts to Christianity
Syrian Christian saints
Assyrian Church of the East saints
Patriarchs of the Church of the East
120 deaths
Year of birth unknown
1st-century bishops
2nd-century bishops
Christian missionaries in Asia
Miracle workers
Bishops of Edessa